The Aranmore Catholic College is a co-educational school for ages 7-12, located in Leederville in Perth, Western Australia.

History 

The College was founded in 1903 by the Sisters of Mercy and was originally known as Arranmore, a name taken from Arranmore Island off Ireland’s Donegal coast, with its official title being Our Lady of Perpetual Succour School.

The first Mass was said on the 27 May 1903, and in April of the next year a new church-school building was ready for use and the sisters moved to Leederville. They lived in a cottage on the corner of Marian and Shakespeare Street. The school was facing Marian Street and was situated where the main playing/recreation area is located now. The Convent and the school were very much intertwined. In the early days and during the war, 12 girls boarded at Arranmore.

A purpose-built Convent was opened on the 21 November 1933 and was known as St Mary’s Convent under the patronage of Our Lady of Perpetual Succour.

Both girls and boys attended this school from kindergarten to seventh grade, at which point the boys left to continue their education elsewhere. The girls usually continued on to the high school as it was then known.

In 1942, Monsignor Moloney invited the Christian Brothers to come to Leederville and start a boys’ only school commencing at Grade 4 and the Brothers enrolled, in the next few years, boys from Grade 4 to Leaving Certificate.

Education on the girl’s original school site had a primary school and a high school, although all students after grade 7 went to the high school.  This really meant that the school fee at the primary school was cheaper than the fee charged at the high school and a different uniform was worn.  There was fierce competition between these two schools on the same site, particularly when it came to sports and education endeavours. This friendly rivalry continued until 1954 when a new school was built, also by Monsignor Moloney, named St Mary’s College, and catered for all students from Grade 1 to Year 12.

The first Federal Government grant to come to St Mary’s was in 1967 when Mother Edmund (Sr Joan Flynn), then Principal of St Mary’s College, received a Grant for the Science Block, situated on the corner of Marian and Shakespeare Street.

With foresight in mind, in 1972 the Principals of the two colleges (St Mary’s and CBC) decided to trial what was called co-facilitation of Years 11 and 12.  This meant that the females wishing to study the Physical Sciences and some Mathematics (2 and 3) would attend jointly with the males. The boys wishing to do some Arts subjects and the Biological sciences would join with the girls. This was not a formal arrangement and was done in the interest of economics and more choice for the students. It also paved the way for a more formal co-education arrangement that took more years to accomplish.

To make more room for the expanding college on the St Mary’s site, the Primary School was able to obtain land in Brentham Street and a new school was built for them. The primary school moved into the new premises in 1976, finally receiving a standalone identity. Along with this, the Christian Brothers moved their primary section of the College to Jugan Street to the site of St Bernadette’s School when the numbers attending that school made its viability weak. Later the Brothers closed that school when they could no longer staff it and the boys attended St Mary’s Primary until year 7.

After lengthy discussions, (approximately 5 years)  firstly with parents, the Catholic Education Office, the Sisters of Mercy West Perth and Christian Brothers, and rationalisation of the single sex schools in the area, a decision was made to amalgamate the two schools and to become Aranmore Catholic College in 1986. The Colleges were also handed over to the Catholic Education Commission of WA and became their management responsibility with a strong commitment from both the Founding Congregations.

Curriculum 
Aranmore Catholic College provides a strong educational foundation for all its students both academically, physically and spiritually. Students in Years 7, 8 & 9 receive an in-depth education across all of the Learning Areas. The emphasis is on building important learning skills and preparing students for Senior School.

Year 11 and Year 12 students choose subjects to study from a diverse list available at the College. All students study Religion & Life, English/English as an additional Language or Dialect and Mathematics.

Students will then be able to choose 3 other subjects based on their Post school destinations. Aranmore also offers an extensive Vocational and Education program in which students mix traditional schooling, Work Experience and formal study at a Registered Training Organisation (RTO). Students on this pathway can earn Certificate I, II or III. Unique to Aranmore is the Onsite workplace learning program.

The College also provides a number of international students with support in English through the IEC (Intensive English Centre)and EALD program. Aboriginal students are supported by dedicated staff from the Aboriginal Students Program.

A particular pride of the Aranmore community is their highly respected music, netball and rugby specialist programs.

Demographics 
Aranmore educates approximately 700 students who come from a variety of cultural and socioeconomic backgrounds. The student body consists of local students both north and south of Leederville, students from regional WA and students from across the globe. It hosts a number of international students who are part of the IEC (Intensive English Centre) and Aboriginal students who are part of the nationally awarded Aboriginal Student Program.

The College began taking in Year 7 students , to join the previous Year 8 to 12 demographic.

Location 
Located just up from the Oxford St strip, Aranmore boasts a picturesque campus, nestled within the residential area with easy access to public transport. In recent years, the College has undergone an extensive building program where the College was able to retain its character buildings but refurbish them with contemporary classrooms and modern facilities.

A new Centre for Arts & Sports Science (CASS) on the Oxford St streetside of the College, over the old Foley House building site has been built  It includes a full sized multi-use court, Health and Physical Education offices, classrooms, extensive weights room, storage rooms, kitchen and a large stage area with green rooms.  Below on the Oxford Street level there are further classrooms for dance and drama along with significant storage areas for props and costumes.

The Science building has been refurbished and visitors can witness the many hands-on experiments, using modern and traditional equipment taking place regularly.

Most recently, the Mann building has been upgraded to include a modern, state-of-the-art gourmet kitchen facility for the popular Food Technology classes.

Despite being an inner city school, students have access to large recreational spaces on campus and the College regularly utilises City of Vincent amenities such as Loftus Recreation Centre, Beatty Park and Britannia Reserve.

Notable alumni 
Michael MaloneiiNet founder and CEO
 Ryan CampbellWestern Warriors cricket player
Tony Fraser, West Perth footballer
 Bryson GoodwinNRL Bulldogs/Rabbitohs
 Bronx GoodwinNRL Raiders/Sharks
Tom Hogan, Test cricketer
 Daniel HoldsworthNRL Dragons/Bulldogs
 Kane KotekaWestern Force rugby union player
 Thon MakerMilwaukee Bucks NBA basketball player (2010)
Tony Simpson, WA  MLA
 Corey PatersonNRL Knights/Tiger
 Chance PeniMelbourne Rebels rugby union player
 Curtis RonaCanterbury-Bankstown Bulldogs rugby league player, Western Force rugby player, Australian Wallaby test match rugby player player
 Lee Te MaariNRL Bulldogs
Michael Veletta, Test cricketer
 Mike Willesee Australian television presenter
Mark Zanotti, Subiaco Lions, West Coast Eagles, Brisbane Bears and Fitzroy footballer

See also 

 Catholic education in Australia 
 Education in Western Australia
 List of schools in the Perth metropolitan area

References

Further reading

External links 
 Aranmore Catholic College

Educational institutions established in 1903
Catholic secondary schools in Perth, Western Australia
Leederville, Western Australia
State Register of Heritage Places in the City of Vincent
1903 establishments in Australia
Sisters of Mercy schools